Ciaran Nugent (born October 27, 1991) is an American soccer player who last played for Irish side Galway United in the League of Ireland Premier Division.

Soccer career

College and amateur
Nugent began playing college soccer at Lehigh University in 2010, where he played for four years, as well as red-shirted year in 2013.

While at college, Nugent appeared for USL PDL sides Portland Phoenix in 2012, Reading United AC in 2013, and Real Boston Rams in 2014, .

Professional career
Nugent signed with United Soccer League club Harrisburg City Islanders, affiliate of MLS side, the Philadelphia Union, on April 2, 2015.

On January 27, 2016 Nugent signed for Sligo Rovers in the League of Ireland Premier Division making over 9 starts, 7 clean sheets and 12 professional appearances.

On January 17, 2017, Nugent signed for Galway United in the League of Ireland Premier Division.

References

External links
 Lehigh University bio
 City Islanders bio
 Sligo Rovers bio

1991 births
Living people
American soccer players
Lehigh Mountain Hawks men's soccer players
Real Boston Rams players
Penn FC players
Sligo Rovers F.C. players
Galway United F.C. players
Association football goalkeepers
Soccer players from Massachusetts
USL League Two players
USL Championship players
Sportspeople from Dedham, Massachusetts
American expatriate soccer players
American expatriate sportspeople in Ireland
Expatriate association footballers in Ireland